Coral Petkovich is an Australian writer of biographies and a translator of both Bosnian and Croatian to English.

Her 2012 translation of Selvedin Avdić's 2010 book Seven Terrors was shortlisted for the Science Fiction & Fantasy Translation Awards in 2013.

Early life and education 
Petkovich was born in Perth to mother May Watson.

She studied at the University of Western Australia.

Career 
Petkovich has written two biographies, her first being Ivan, From the Adriatic to Pacific published in 2009 by Glass House books is a memoir of Croatian man Ivan Antulich who grew up during World War I. Her second book, May's Story, published in 2016, is a biography of her mother's life.

She has also translated two novels from Bosnian and Croatian into English: Seven Terrors by Selvedin Avdić and Hair Everywhere by Tea Tulić.

Her translation of Seven Terrors was shortlisted for the Science Fiction & Fantasy Translation Awards in 2013 and longlisted for the International Dublin Literary Award in 2013.

Personal life 
Petkovich lives in Perth, Western Australia.

References

Australian translators
Living people
Year of birth missing (living people)

External links 

 Coral Petkovich - Twitter 
21st-century Australian writers
21st-century Australian women writers
University of Western Australia alumni
21st-century translators
Translators to English
Translators from Bosnian
21st-century memoirists
Translators from Croatian